khanderao market is a famous and palatial building located in the city of Vadodara, Gujarat, in western India.
It was erected by Maharaja Sayajirao Gaekwad III in 1906, named after Khande Rao Gaekwad, Maharaja of Baroda (1856–1870). It was presented by him as a gift to the Municipality to mark the Silver Jubilee of his administration. The offices of the Vadodara Municipal Corporation are located in this building. Fresh vegetable and flower market is also located in the back garden.

Location
It is located on Chamaraja Road in Vadodara. It was named after Chamaraja Wodeyar, Maharaja of Mysore who was a close friend of Maharaja Sayajirao Gaekwad III to mark the friendship between Maharaja Sayajirao Gaekwad III. Similarly a road in Mysore as Sayajirao Road. Chamaraja Road starts from Eastern gate of Lakshmi Vilas Palace and has other prominent landmarks like Kirti Stambh and others before terminating near Bhagat Singh Chowk.

Nowadays, street Photographers of vadodara are exploring it for hidden stories.

References

Buildings and structures in Vadodara
Vadodara
Baroda State
Retail markets in India